Tatiana Ivanovna Burina (born 20 March 1980) is a Russian retired ice hockey forward. In December 2017, she was one of eleven Russian athletes who were banned for life from the Olympics by the International Olympic Committee, after doping offences at the 2014 Winter Olympics.

International career
Burina was selected for the Russia national women's ice hockey team in the 2002, 2006 and 2010 Winter Olympics. In 2002, she recorded four goals in five games to lead the team in scoring. In 2006, she had one goal in five games, and in 2010 she had three points in five games. She also played in the qualifying tournament for the 2006 Olympics. 
Burina has also appeared for Russia at eleven IIHF Women's World Championships. Her first appearance came in 1999. She won bronze medals at the 2001, 2013 and 2016 tournaments.

Career statistics

International career

References

External links
 
 

1980 births
Living people
Sportspeople from Novosibirsk
Russian women's ice hockey forwards
HC Tornado players
HC SKIF players
Biryusa Krasnoyarsk players
Ice hockey players at the 2002 Winter Olympics
Ice hockey players at the 2006 Winter Olympics
Ice hockey players at the 2010 Winter Olympics
Ice hockey players at the 2014 Winter Olympics
Olympic ice hockey players of Russia
Doping cases in ice hockey
Russian sportspeople in doping cases